Semestene is a comune (municipality) in the Province of Sassari in the Italian region Sardinia, located about  north of Cagliari and about  southeast of Sassari.

Semestene borders the following municipalities: Bonorva, Cossoine, Macomer, Pozzomaggiore, Sindia.

Demographic evolution

References

Cities and towns in Sardinia